The Saale, also known as the Saxon Saale and Thuringian Saale, is a river in Germany and a left-bank tributary of the Elbe. It is not to be confused with the smaller Franconian Saale, a right-bank tributary of the Main, or the Saale in Lower Saxony, a tributary of the Leine.

Etymology
The name Saale comes from the Proto-Indo-European root *séles 'marsh', akin to Welsh hêl, heledd 'river meadow', Cornish heyl 'estuary', Greek hélos 'marsh, meadow', Sanskrit sáras 'lake, pond', Sárasvati 'sacred river', Old Persian Harauvati 'Hārūt River; Arachosia', Avestan Haraxvatī, idem. It may also be related to the Indo-European root *sal, "salt".

The Slavic name of the Saale, Solawa, still found in Sorbian texts, comes from Old High German sol, "salt", and awa, "water".

Course

It pursues a winding course in a northern direction, and after passing the manufacturing town of Hof, enters Thuringia. It flows amid well-wooded low mountains of the Thuringian Forest until it reaches the valley of Saalfeld. After leaving Saalfeld the Saale reaches Rudolstadt. Here it receives the waters of the Schwarza, in whose valley lies the ruined castle of Schwarzburg, the ancestral seat of the formerly ruling House of Schwarzburg.

From Saalfeld the Saale enters the limestone hill region north of the Thuringian Forest, and sweeps beneath the hills enclosing the university town of Jena. It enters Saxony-Anhalt and passes the spa of Bad Kösen and, after receiving the deep and navigable Unstrut at Naumburg, flows past Weißenfels, Merseburg, Halle, Bernburg and Calbe.

The Saale is navigable from Naumburg and is also planned connected from Leuna with the White Elster near Leipzig by an unfinished canal. The soil of the lower part of its valley is exceptionally fertile, and produces, amongst other crops, large supplies of sugar beet. Among its tributaries are the White Elster, Southern and Northern Regnitz and Orla on the right bank, and the Ilm, Unstrut, Salza, Wipper and Bode on the left. Its upper course is rapid. Its valley, down to Merseburg, contains many castles which crown the enclosing heights.

Geography
Originating in Zell, the Saale flows through – Sparneck – Weißdorf – Seulbitz – Förbau – Schwarzenbach an der Saale – Fattigau – Oberkotzau – Hof – Brunnenthal – Saalenstein – Joditz – Landesgrenze Bayern/Thüringen – Hirschberg – Sparnberg – Rudolphstein – Blankenberg – Blankenstein – Harra – Saaldorf – Saalburg – Poeritzsch – Gräfenwarth – Burgk – Walsburg – Ziegenrück – Neidenberga – Hohenwarte – Eichicht – Kaulsdorf – Fischersdorf – Weischwitz – Reschwitz – Breternitz – Saalfeld – Schwarza – Volkstedt – Rudolstadt – Catharinau – Kolkwitz – Weißen – Uhlstädt – Rückersdorf – Zeutsch – Niederkrossen – Orlamünde – Freienorla – Großeutersdorf – Kleineutersdorf – Kahla – Großpürschütz – Jägersdorf – Rothenstein – Maua – Lobeda – Jena – Zwätzen – Porstendorf – Dornburg – Dorndorf-Steudnitz – Wichmar – Camburg – Tümpling – Großheringen – Kleinheringen – Landesgrenze Thüringen/Sachsen-Anhalt – Stendorf – Saaleck – Bad Kösen – Naumburg – Schellsitz - Schönburg – Eulau – Goseck – Leißling – Lobitzsch – Uichteritz – Markweben – Weißenfels – Dehlitz – Schkortleben – Kleinkorbetha – Großkorbetha – Oebles-Schlechtewitz – Wengelsdorf – Bad Dürrenberg – Kröllwitz – Leuna – Trebnitz – Merseburg – Meuschau – Freiimfelde – Schkopau – Korbetha – Hohenweiden – Rockendorf – Holleben – Halle – Kröllwitz – Lettin – Brachwitz – Schiepzig – Salzmünde – Pfützthal – Döblitz – Zaschwitz – Wettin – Kloschwitz – Rumpin – Dobis – Friedeburg – Zickeritz – Rothenburg – Nelben – Gnölbzig – Trebnitz – Alsleben – Poplitz – Großwirschleben – Plötzkau – Gröna – Neuborna – Bernburg – Dröbel – Nienburg – Wedlitz – Damaschkeplan – Wispitz – Calbe (Saale) – Trabitz – Groß Rosenburg – Werkleitz

Tributaries

See also
 Saale-Unstrut, a wine-growing region
 List of rivers of Bavaria
 List of rivers of Thuringia
 List of rivers of Saxony-Anhalt

References

Sources 
 Ernst-Otto Luthardt, Reinhard Feldrapp: An der Saale. Vom Fichtelgebirge durch Thüringen bis zur Elbe. Würzburg 1990. 
 Wolf Thieme, Markus Altmann (Fotos): Mitten ins Herz. Sie entspringt in Bayern, durchquert Thüringen und fließt in Sachsen-Anhalt in die Elbe – die Saale ist ein Fluss, der alles verbindet. Und jedem Spaß macht: dem Sportler, dem Kulturfreund, dem Faulenzer. In: stern Nr. 26 (22. Juni 2006), S. 84-89. (Online-Version)

External links 
 

Federal waterways in Germany
Fichtel Mountains
Rivers of Bavaria
Rivers of Saxony-Anhalt
Rivers of Thuringia
 Saale
Rivers of Germany